Wally Dallenbach Sr. (born December 12, 1936) is a former Indy car driver from East Brunswick Township, New Jersey, USA. He drove in 180 Indy Car races between 1965 and 1979, winning five times. He is the father of NASCAR driver and commentator, Wally Dallenbach Jr.

Biography
Dallenbach nearly won the 1975 Indianapolis 500, dueling with A. J. Foyt for many laps.  He led for half of the race, but burned a piston on lap 162, twelve laps before the race was called due to rain. Bobby Unser won the race, which was halted at lap 174 (435 miles).

He joined CART as competition director in 1980 and became chief steward of the sport in 1981, a position he held until 2004.  Under his tenure, he improved the safety program in CART.  He also established nondenominational church services for drivers and their families.

Dallenbach has been inducted into the Colorado Sports Hall of Fame, due to his exploits at the Pikes Peak International Hill Climb, and the New Jersey Sports Hall of Fame. Dallenbach was also voted into the American Motorcyclist Association Motorcycle Hall of Fame, for his work as founder and president of the Colorado 500 Invitational charity motorcycle rides.
  
Dallenbach was voted into the Colorado Motorsports Hall of Fame.

He will be inducted into the Motorsports Hall of Fame of America on March 17, 2020.

He is the brother of the former Pillar of Fire International superintendent Robert Barney Dallenbach.

Racing results

Indy 500 results

In 1972, Dallenbach was bumped on the final day of time trials. Art Pollard crashed his qualified car on May 16, and was too injured to drive on race day. Dallenbach was hired to fill the seat, and the car was moved to 33rd starting position.

USAC Champ Car results
(key) (Races in bold indicate pole position)

CART IndyCar Series results
(key)

Current life
Dallenbach maintains his interest in motorsports as the president of the Colorado 500 motorcycle race. This event has raised over a million dollars in community support for the town of Basalt, Colorado, located in the Roaring Fork Valley region of western Colorado.

He owns a ranch, fairground, cabins and a private automotive restoration garage near the Fryingpan River in upper Basalt.

References

1936 births
Champ Car drivers
Indianapolis 500 drivers
International Race of Champions drivers
Living people
People from East Brunswick, New Jersey
Racing drivers from New Jersey
Sportspeople from the New York metropolitan area
People from Basalt, Colorado
USAC Silver Crown Series drivers